Kodalikkallu Aru is a small river in Northern Province, Sri Lanka. The river rises in south-east Mullaitivu District, before flowing north-east/north through Mullaitivu District. The river empties into Nanthi Kadal lagoon.

See also 
 List of rivers of Sri Lanka

References 

Rivers of Sri Lanka
Bodies of water of Mullaitivu District